Aplus is a genus of sea snails, marine gastropod mollusks in the family Pisaniidae, .

Distribution
Mediterranean Sea.

Species
Species within the genus Aplus include:
 Aplus assimilis (Reeve, 1846)
 Aplus campisii (Ardovini, 2015)
 Aplus dorbignyi (Payraudeau, 1826)
 Aplus gaillardoti (Puton, 1856)
 Aplus nodulosus (Bivona Ant., 1832)
 † Aplus pseudoassimilis Brunetti & Della Bella, 2016
 Aplus scaber (Locard, 1892)
 Aplus scacchianus (Philippi, 1844)

References

Pisaniidae